"M.I.A" is a song by English singer Cher Lloyd. Released on 11 October 2019, under Universal Music Group, the song is the official lead single of her upcoming third studio album, following her comeback "None Of My Business" in October 2018. An accompanying video directed by Raja Virdi was premiered on YouTube on the day of the song's release.

Background and promotion
Lloyd began teasing the song on 3 October 2019 by posting cryptic images of the acronym on her social media spelling out the title. In an interview with Euphoria, Lloyd stated that "the whole concept behind that song was being at a party that you really really don't want to be at, but you want to be with that person and you'd rather be anywhere else if it means that you get to be with that person".

Lloyd embarked on a week-long radio tour in the UK from 10–17 November 2019, where she did acoustic sessions and interviews in promotion of the song. In terms of live performances, she performed the song live once at the German TV show ZDF-Fernsehgarten on 13 October 2019.

The song failed to achieve much chart success at all due to poor promotion, however it did spend 4 weeks on Ultratop Wallonia under top 50 chart.

Critical reception
Lilly Pace of Billboard stated "The infectious new song recounts the singer's time at a bad party, where she asks someone she has her eye on to run away with her." Writing for Idolator Mike Neid stated: "'M.I.A', [Lloyd's] latest is a bright anthem that finds her convincing a potential partner to leave a party. And she makes a damn good case. 'Let's make a quick getaway. This party's shit anyway. Or we could go M.I.A.'"

Music video
The official video to the single premiered on YouTube the day of the song's release. It was shot at the Barbican Estate. The music video depicts Lloyd performing choreography with backup dancers on different settings of the Barbican. The video was produced by Phase Films and directed by Raja Virdi. In an interview with Billboard, Cher stated "This song is a mood, it's about capturing a feeling. I wanted the video to mirror exactly that. I wanted the vibe to feel playful, expressive, and fun. Every look gives a great insight into who I am and my personality."

Track listing 
Digital download / streaming
 "M.I.A" - 2:37

Digital download / streaming (Cahill Edit)
 "M.I.A" (Cahill Edit) - 3:00

Personnel
Credits adapted from YouTube Music.
 Cher Lloyd – vocals, songwriting
 Joznez – production, studio personnel, mixing
 Nico The Owl – Production
 Dave Kutch – studio personnel, mastering engineer
 Lex Barkey – studio personnel, mixing
 Jeremia Jones – songwriter
 Gia Koka – songwriter
 Morien van der Tang – songwriter
 Stevie Appleton – songwriter

Release history

References

2019 singles
2019 songs
Cher Lloyd songs